Samore is a surname. Notable people with the surname include:

 Gary Samore, Barack Obama's White House Coordinator for Arms Control and Weapons of Mass Destruction
 Antonio Samorè (1905–1983), Italian Cardinal of the Catholic Church
 Samori Ture (c. 1830–1900), founder of the Wassoulou Empire
Dr Azam Samore, Medical Professional and famous Punjabi Language Poet from Chakwal, Pakistan (1964-)
Abhishek Singh Samore (1995 - ), Founder & President of NGO: Jai Jawan Society